The Nardi test, also known as the morphine-neostigmine provocation test is a test for dysfunction of the sphincter of Oddi, a valve which divides the biliary tract from the duodenum. Two medications, morphine and neostigmine, are given to people with symptoms concerning for sphincter dysfunction, including sharp right-sided abdominal pain. If the pain is reproduced by the medications, then dysfunction is more likely. The test poorly predicts dysfunction, however, and is rarely used today. The Nardi test was named for George Nardi, who first described the procedure in 1966.

References
Nardi GL, Acosta JM.Papillitis as a cause of pancreatitis and abdominal pain: role of evocative test, operative pancreatography and histologic evaluation. Ann. Surg. 1966 Oct;164(4):611-21. 
Steinberg WM. Sphincter of Oddi dysfunction: a clinical controversy. Gastroenterology 1988;95:1409-1415 

Medical tests